Roobha is a 2018 Canadian feature film produced by Warren Sinnathamby, and written and directed by Lenin M. Sivam. The film which was produced under the banner of Next Productions, stars Amrit Sandhu, Antonythasan Jesuthasan , Thenuka Kantharajah, Sornalingam Vyramuthu, Cassandra James, Dan Bertolini, Tharshiny Varapragasam, Bhavani Somasundaram, Sumathy Balram, and Ishwaria Chandru. It is based on a story by Antonythasan Jesuthasan who writes under the pseudonym Shoba Sakthi. The film explores the harsh realities faced by a young South-Asian trans-woman who struggles to make a living in Toronto after she is ostracized by her family. Roobha had its world premiere at Montreal World Film Festival on August 25, 2018. 
 It was also the opening film of the 18th Annual Reelworld Film Festival in Toronto, Canada, an Official Selection for the Cambridge Film Festival in UK, Official Selection in the World Panorama Section of  the International Film Festival of India in Goa., Official Selection of the Windsor International Film Festival in Canada, Official Selection of the Whistler Film Festival in Canada, London Indian Film Festival in UK, Official Selection of the Melbourne Indian Film Festival in Australia, and Kashish Mumbai International Queer Film Festival in Mumbai, India.

Plot
Roobha weaves a unique romantic tale that deals with the complexities of personality and gender identity within the South-Asian community. Roobha, a trans-woman, struggles to make a living in Toronto after she is ostracized by her family. Her chance encounter with a family man, Anthony, leads to a beautiful romance. However, their blissful existence is short-lived as their families soon discover their relationship.

Production
The Producer, Warren Sinnathamby, the Executive Producer, Raji Nair, and the Line Producer, Pras Lingam, were at the helm of the production team. A pilot shoot was done in late 2015, with the actual production commencing in April 2016 in Toronto. Arsenij Gusev, handled the cinematography, while Bettina Katja Lange was the Art Director, and Princeten Charles handled location sound. The dance sequences were choreographed by Thenuka Kantharajah. The First Assistant Director, Evan Stephens, was instrumental in the filming being completed as per the tight schedule.

Post-production
The post-production was completed in a facility in Halifax, Nova Scotia.

Distribution
The North American distribution is being handled by Indiecan Entertainment Inc.

Cast
Amrit Sandhu as Roobha
A trans-woman who is ostracized by her family, and faces homophobia as she struggles to make a living . The Vancouver-based model, actor and trainer, Amrit Sandhu, was cast as Roobha, after much searching. Amrit trained for the role in earnest by speaking to members of the community as well as academics, taking dance lessons, observing trans-women as they manoeuvred through their day-to-day life, etc. Amrit says that he was appalled by the way a passerby hurled abuses at him, when he was in character on set. That incident made him realize the how much loathing and violence trans-women have to endure in their daily life.
Antonythasan Jesuthasan as Anthony
A middle-aged hardworking family man who falls in love with Roobha. Antonythasan Jesuthasan of 'Dheepan' fame https://www.imdb.com/title/tt4082068/ fit into the role of Anthony with ease. After Anthony comes to Roobha's rescue at a pub, they are inexplicably drawn towards each other, and a rapturous romance ensues. As the writer of the story, Anthonythasan, was familiar with the nuances of the character he had created. Driving a vehicle was the only hurdle he envisaged,  but production took care of that. 
Thenuka Kantharajah as Pavun
A dedicated homemaker who is shaken to the core when her husband seeks love elsewhere. Thenuka Kantharajah, the renowned dancer and actor was chosen to play the role of Pavun.  A pillar of support to her husband through thick and thin, Pavun is shattered at the turn of events, but faces the situation with dignity. Being an accomplished dancer, Thenuka also trained Amrit in dance. She choreographed all the dance sequences in the film. 
Sornalingam Vairamuthu as Manoharan
A father who is distraught to learn that his son wants to assert his gender as a woman. Sornalingam, a prominent stage actor and an active member of the South-Asian Community was cast for the role of Manoharan.   
Cassandra James as Lucia
A trans-woman who comes to the aid of Roobha in her hour of need. Cassandra James brings beauty, grace and boldness to the character she essays.
Bhavani Somasundaram as Mani
Sumathy Balram as Rani
Dan Bertolini as Maya
Tharshiny Varapragasam as Mata
Brian Scott Carleton as Dr. Jefferson
Tony Cauch as Dr. Finch
Ishwaria Chandru as Vasuki
Angela Chrstine as Mai
Claudio Venditi as Sam
James Coburn as Dr. Lawrence
Gwenlyn Cumyn as Receptionist

Festivals 
Official Selection,  Montreal World Film Festival in August, 2018
Opening Film, Reelworld Film Festival in September, 2018
Official Selection, Cambridge Film Festival in October, 2018
Official Selection, Windsor International Film Festival in October, 2018
Official Selection, International Film Festival of India in November, 2018
Official Selection, Whistler Film Festival in December, 2018
Official Selection, London Indian Film Festival in June, 2019
Official Selection, KASHISH Mumbai International Queer Film Festival in June, 2019
Official Selection, Indian Film Festival of Melbourne in July, 2019

References

External links 
 

2010s Tamil-language films
Films set in Toronto
Canadian drama films
2018 crime thriller films
Films about trans women
Canadian LGBT-related films
2018 LGBT-related films
2018 drama films
2010s Canadian films
Canadian multilingual films